The Sánchez-Casal Cup is a professional tennis tournament played on clay courts. It is currently part of the ATP Challenger Tour. It is held annually in Barcelona, Spain since 2018.

Past finals

Singles

Doubles

ATP Challenger Tour
Clay court tennis tournaments
Tennis tournaments in Barcelona
Recurring sporting events established in 2018